Nightcrawler is the third full-length studio album released by singer Pete Yorn.

Track listing
All songs written by Pete Yorn except where noted.

 "Vampyre" 
 "For Us" 
 "Undercover" 
 "Policies" 
 "The Man" 
 "Maybe I'm Right" (Pete Yorn, Eric Ernest Johnson)
 "Same Thing" 
 "Alive" (Pete Yorn, Baerwald)
 "Splendid Isolation" (Warren Zevon)
 "Broken Bottle"
 "How Do You Go On" 
 "Ice Age" 
 "Georgie Boy" 
 "Bandstand in the Sky"

Upon release of the album, many retailers offered exclusive tracks from Pete Yorn, either via download or as bonus tracks on the actual album.

 Japanese Import bonus tracks:
"Never My Love"
"Don't Mean Nothing"
"Good Advice"

 iTunes exclusive download:
"Go with It"

 Best Buy exclusive CD bonus tracks"
"Baby I'm Gone"
"The Party"

 F.Y.E. exclusive CD bonus tracks:
"Top of the World"
"Can't Hear Anyone"

 Circuit City exclusive download:
"Old Boy"

 Sony Music Store exclusive download:
"Shallow (Friends)"

References

Pete Yorn albums
2006 albums
Albums produced by Tony Berg
Columbia Records albums